Atagay is an urban locality (urban-type settlement) in Nizhneudinsky District of Irkutsk Oblast, Russia. Population:

References

Notes

Sources

Registry of the Administrative-Territorial Formations of Irkutsk Oblast 

Urban-type settlements in Irkutsk Oblast